The 2006 McDonald's All-American Boys Game was an All-star basketball game played on Wednesday, March 29, 2006 at Cox Arena in San Diego, California, home of the San Diego State University.  The game's rosters featured the best and most highly recruited high school boys graduating in 2007.  The game was the 29th annual version of the McDonald's All-American Game first played in 1978.

The 48 players were selected from 2,500 nominees by a committee of basketball experts. They were chosen not only for their on-court skills, but for their performances off the court as well. Coach Morgan Wootten, who had more than 1,200 wins as head basketball coach at DeMatha High School, was chairman of the selection committee. Legendary UCLA coach John Wooden, who has been involved in the McDonald's All American Games since its inception, served as chairman of the Games and as an advisor to the selection committee.

Proceeds from the 2006 McDonald's All American High School Basketball Games went to Ronald McDonald House Charities (RMHC) of San Diego and its Ronald McDonald House program.

2006 game
The game was telecast live by ESPN.  The halftime performance by hip hop artist Nick Cannon took second stage to the showcase of basketball talent at the 2006 McDonald’s All American Games.

A sold-out boys' game was headlined by hometown favorite and co-Most Valuable Player of the Game, Chase Budinger (Houston Rockets), who had 11 points, four assists, three steals and three rebounds. He shared the John R. Wooden Most Valuable Player Award with West-squad teammate Kevin Durant (Golden State Warriors), who racked-up 25 points, five rebounds, four assists and two steals. The East Team was led by Gerald Henderson (Charlotte Bobcats) with 16 points and Thaddeus Young (Indiana Pacers) with 14 points. Morgan Wootten Player of the Year award winner and boys' East Team player Greg Oden (Portland Trail Blazers) also had a stellar game with 10 points, five rebounds and four blocks despite an injured right wrist.

The 2006 crop of McDonald’s All Americans made a huge impact during their inaugural season in the NCAA, including placing three players each on the 2007 rosters of the ACC-champion North Carolina Tarheels and Big Ten-champion Ohio State Buckeyes. The Big 12 Champion-Kansas Jayhawks also had two players from this squad.

The West Team came back from being down by 20 points during the first half to win the game 112– 94. The West’s victory was their first since 2001 and narrowed the series lead to 16–13 in favor of the East squad.

East roster

West roster

Coaches
The East team was coached by:
 Head coach Doug Lipscomb of Wheeler High School (Marietta, Georgia)
 Asst coach Marc Carver of Wheeler High School (Marietta, Georgia)
 Asst coach Bennie Gibbs of Berkmar High School (Lilburn, Georgia)

The West team was coached by:
 Head coach Harvey Kitani of Fairfax High School (Los Angeles, California)
 Asst coach J.D. Green of Fairfax High School (Los Angeles, California)
 Asst coach Scott Ogden of Carlsbad High School (Carlsbad, California)

Box score

Visitors: East

Home: West 

(* = Starting line-up)

All-American Week

Schedule 

 Tuesday, March 28: Powerade Jamfest
 Slam Dunk Contest
 Three-Point Shoot-out
 Timed Basketball Skills Competition
 Wednesday, March 29: 29th Annual Boys All-American Game

The Powerade JamFest is a skills-competition evening featuring basketball players who demonstrate their skills in three crowd-entertaining ways.  The slam dunk contest was first held in 1987, and a 3-point shooting challenge was added in 1989.  This year, for the first time, a timed basketball skills competition was added to the schedule of events.

Contest Winners 
 The 2006 Powerade Slam Dunk contest was won by Gerald Henderson.
 Wayne Ellington was winner of the 2006 3-point shoot-out.
 The skills competition was won by James Keefe.

See also
 2006 McDonald's All-American Girls Game

References

External links
 McDonald's All-American on the web

2005–06 in American basketball
2006
2006 in sports in California
Basketball competitions in California
Sports competitions in San Diego